Euglyphis is a genus of moths in the family Lasiocampidae. The genus was erected by Jacob Hübner in 1820.

Selected species
Euglyphis amida (Druce, 1890)
Euglyphis ampira (Druce, 1890)
Euglyphis lascoria (Druce, 1890)
Euglyphis rivulosa (Drury, 1773)

References

External links
 , 2011: A distinctive new species of Euglyphis Hübner (Lepidoptera: Lasiocampidae) from Costa Rica, with a checklist of the Euglyphis known from Costa Rica. Zootaxa, 3020: 49–59. Preview
 , 2012: Changes in the suprageneric classification of Lasiocampidae (Lepidoptera) based on the nucleotide sequence of gene EF-1α. Entomological Review 92 (5): 531–547. Abstract: .

Lasiocampidae
Moth genera